MrBeast (born 1998) is a YouTuber.

Mr. Beast or Mr Beast may also refer to:
 Mr Beast (album), by the Scottish post-rock group Mogwai
 Mr. Beast (wrestler), stage name of Peter John Ramos (born 1985)

See also
 The Beast (disambiguation)
 MrBeast Burger, virtual restaurant run by YouTuber MrBeast